Bannockburn is an unincorporated community in Berrien County, Georgia, United States.

The former Central of Georgia Railway ran through the settlement.

The Riverside Hotel in Bannockburn was built around 1905. The mill closed about 1910.

References

 

Unincorporated communities in Berrien County, Georgia
Unincorporated communities in Georgia (U.S. state)